A flying ace is a military aviator credited with shooting down several enemy aircraft.

Flying Ace or Fighter Ace may also refer to:
Flying Aces (magazine)
Fighter Ace (video game)
The Flying Ace, 1926 movie
Flying Aces (roller coaster), a roller coaster at Ferrari World in Abu Dhabi, United Arab Emirates